Basil Clifford (20 April 1938 – 14 November 1973) was an Irish middle-distance runner. He competed in the men's 1500 metres at the 1964 Summer Olympics. He was killed in an explosion at a gun factory in Birmingham in November 1973.

References

1938 births
1973 deaths
Athletes (track and field) at the 1964 Summer Olympics
Irish male middle-distance runners
Olympic athletes of Ireland
Place of birth missing